Nevada Barr (born March 1, 1952) is an American author of mystery fiction. She is known for her Anna Pigeon series, which is primarily set in a series of national parks and other protected areas of the United States.

Early life
Although Barr was born in Yerington, Nevada, she was named not after her state of birth but after a character in one of her father's favorite books.

She grew up in Johnstonville, California, a place near Susanville, California in the far northern section of California, one of two daughters. Her parents ran a small airport in Susanville, where her mother was both a pilot and a mechanic.

In her teenage years she learned to pilot a plane from her mother. Barr received her bachelor's degree in speech and drama, and master's degree in acting at California Polytechnic State University, San Luis Obispo, in southern California. She finished her education at the University of California, Irvine.

Artistic career
Barr trained in drama and was a professional actor on stage and in voice-overs for 18 years after receiving her master's degree at University of California at Irvine. She began writing in those years.  She lived in New York City and Minneapolis and had a brief early marriage before moving to Clinton, Mississippi, to work as a Park Ranger and where she married her second husband.

When Barr's first husband changed careers from being a theatre director and became interested in the environmental movement, she began working as a seasonal park ranger in the summer at several National Parks. Her first permanent park ranger job was on the Natchez Trace Parkway in Mississippi. Barr began writing in earnest in 1978, when she was 26. Her first book was historical, titled Bittersweet was published in 1984. Her first mystery novel Track of the Cat was published in 1993. This won two awards as a first novel.

That first novel featured the character of Anna Pigeon, which character she conceived while working at her second seasonal job in Guadalupe Mountains National Park in Texas. Pigeon is a law enforcement ranger with the United States National Park Service. The first mystery novel became first in a series. The books in the series take place in various national parks (and other protected areas) where Pigeon solves murders that are often related to natural resource issues. The Anna Pigeon character shares several similarities with Barr, such as working as a park ranger and having had a husband who worked in the theater in New York City.

Barr became a full-time writer when her books began to achieve commercial success.

She began painting in 1996, added to her writing, and her work in the National Park Service.

She moved to New Orleans after her third marriage to Donald Paxton and now lives in Oregon.

Personal life 
While in her acting career, Barr had a brief first marriage.They were both in theatre. Her husband developed an interest in the physical environment and took a position in the National Park Service.This sparked a similar interest in Barr. She followed him and secured a position as a seasonal ranger at Isle Royal National Park. She then worked as a seasonal ranger at Guadaloupe Mts and then Mesa Verde. When her marriage ended she returned home to her mother in California.In 1994 she got a permanent position as a Park Ranger on the Natchez Trace Parkway in Mississippi. She was the first female law enforcement ranger to work on the Parkway. 
 
She met her second husband,a second generation Park Ranger also working on The Trace. By this time she'd successfully started her Anna Pigeon mystery series based on a female Park Ranger and set in National Parks. Her husband took an early retiremnt in 1996 and shortly after, Nevada resigned her position to write full time. With her husband assisting in research and acting as her personal assistant, she published a book a year until their divorce in 2006. Shortly after she remarried and moved to New Orleans and continued to write and paint. She now lives in Oregon with her husband.

Bibliography

Anna Pigeon series
1993 Track of the CatGuadalupe Mountains National Park
1994 A Superior DeathIsle Royale National Park
1995 Ill WindMesa Verde National Park
1996 FirestormLassen Volcanic National Park
1997 Endangered SpeciesCumberland Island National Seashore
1998 Blind DescentCarlsbad Caverns National Park
1999 Liberty FallingStatue of Liberty National Monument
2000 Deep SouthNatchez Trace Parkway
2001 Blood LureGlacier National Park
2002 Hunting SeasonNatchez Trace Parkway
2003 FlashbackDry Tortugas National Park
2004 High CountryYosemite National Park
2005 Hard TruthRocky Mountain National Park
2008 Winter StudyIsle Royale National Park
2009 BorderlineBig Bend National Park
2010 BurnNew Orleans Jazz National Historical Park
2012 The RopeGlen Canyon National Recreation Area
2014 Destroyer AngelSuperior National Forest
2016 Boar IslandAcadia National Park

Other books
Barr has published three other novels besides the Anna Pigeon series in addition to a non-fiction book:
1984 Bittersweet, a lesbian historical novel set on the Western frontier
2003 Seeking Enlightenment... Hat by Hat: A Skeptic's Guide to Religion, a memoir
2009 13, a psychological thriller
2019 What Rose Forgot, a standalone thriller

Awards
Barr's début novel, Track of the Cat, won the 1994 Anthony Award and Agatha Award for "Best First Novel". Her next novel, Superior Death, was nominated for the Dilys Award in 1995. Firestorm was nominated for the 1997 Anthony Award in the "Best Novel" category. Blind Descent was the next novel to receive attention from the mystery community, receiving a "Best Novel" nomination at the 1999 Anthony Awards, Dilys Awards and the Macavity Awards in the same year. Deep South, published in 2000, won the Barry Award for "Best Novel" and was again nominated for the Anthony Award in the same category.

In 2011, the National Parks Conservation Association honored Barr with the Robin W. Winks Award for Enhancing Public Understanding of National Parks. The award recognizes an individual or organization that has effectively communicated the values of the National Park System to the American public.

References

External links 

 

1952 births
Living people
Agatha Award winners
American mystery writers
American women novelists
Writers from Nevada
Novelists from Mississippi
Writers from New Orleans
People from Yerington, Nevada
Anthony Award winners
Barry Award winners
University of California, Irvine alumni
20th-century American novelists
21st-century American novelists
People from Lassen County, California
National Park Service personnel
Women mystery writers
20th-century American women writers
21st-century American women writers
Novelists from California
Novelists from Louisiana